Perserikatan Sepakbola Madiun (commonly known as PSM Madiun) is an Indonesian football club based in Madiun, East Java. They currently plays in Liga 3.

History
The club was founded in 1929 under as Madioensche Voetbal Bond (MVB). On April 19, 1930, MVB and seven other clubs established the Persatoean Sepak Raga Seloeroeh Indonesia (Football Association of Indonesia).

Coaching Staff

Stadium
The club's home base is Wilis Stadium (groundshared with Madiun Putra) located at Jalan Mastrip, Klegen, Kartoharjo, Madiun 63117 with a capacity of 25,000 spectators.

References

External links
 

Football clubs in Indonesia
Association football clubs established in 1929
Football clubs in East Java
1929 establishments in the Dutch East Indies